Hayk Kasparov (born 14 December 1984) is an Armenian pop singer.

Career  
In 2008, he won Radio Van's year revelation, and in 2009, the best song at the "Golden Lyre" awards. Also in 2009, he participated in the "Two Stars" musical project of the Public Television of Armenia and left the final. He has shot about 20 videos. He performed concerts in the cities of Sydney and Tehran, as well as many cities of Russia, England, the Netherlands, Belgium and elsewhere. In 2011, he participated in the Star Wars Festival in Tajikistan where he represented Armenia. Also in 2011, the song "I'm with you" was recognized as the best song of the month at "Accord" awards. In 2012, the songs "Gta" and "Songs of Love" also became popular in the month. Since 2014, Kasparov lives in Germany, where he released the "I'm with you" album in 2015.

Discography 
Like a Day (2008)
Shame (2010)
I'm with you (2015)

Awards and achievements 
Here is chronologically the awards Hayk Kasparov has received so far.

References

1984 births
Living people
21st-century Armenian male singers
Armenian pop singers
Musicians from Yerevan